Andersonia sprengelioides is a species of shrub that grows in the south west corner of Western Australia. It was originally described by the botanist Robert Brown in 1810 and retains its original name. The genus Andersonia is classified in the Ericaceae, or in the family Epacridaceae (which is subsumed into Ericaceae by most authors).

References

Epacridoideae
sprengelioides
Endemic flora of Western Australia
Taxa named by Robert Brown (botanist, born 1773)
Plants described in 1810